James Lyle Enyeart (born January 13, 1943 in Auburn, Washington) is an American photographer, scholar and museum director.

Career
Enyeart was the sixth director of the George Eastman Museum (then, George Eastman House) from 1989 to 1995. Before that he served as Director of the Center for Creative Photography at the University of Arizona from 1977 to 1989. In the mid-1970s he was Director of the Friends of Photography in Carmel, California and prior to that was Curator of Photography at the Spencer Museum of art at the University of Kansas from 1968 to 1976. He has held professorships concurrent with his university appointments and was Founding Director of the Anne and John Marion Center for Photographic Arts at the College of Santa Fe (now Santa Fe University of Art and Design) from 1995 to 2002, now Emeritus Anne and John Marion Professor.

Awards
Enyeart has received a John Simon Guggenheim Memorial Fellowship and several other awards, including the Josef Sudek Medal from the Czech Republic, the Photographic Society of Japan achievement award, and the Photokina Obelisk, Cologne, Germany.

Published works
He is also the author of numerous books, including works published by Knopf, Little Brown, Inc, Asahi Shimbum, Johns Hopkins University Press, University of New Mexico Press, University of Arizona Press, the Museum of New Mexico Press, among others. His photographs are collected by the George Eastman Museum, the Smithsonian American Art Museum, the Bibliothèque Nationale in Paris, the Center for Creative Photography, Sheldon Memorial Gallery, Kiasato Museum of Photography, Japan, the Irish Museum of Modern Art, and other museums and private collections.

References 

1943 births
Living people
Directors of George Eastman House
Photography curators
University of Kansas faculty
College of Santa Fe faculty